Weltreise (The World Trip) is the second studio album by German electronical project Schiller by Christopher von Deylen and Mirko von Schlieffen. The album was internationally marketed as Voyage. It became a surprise hit, staying on the top position of the German longplay charts for four consecutive weeks. The album featured Kim Sanders and Peter Heppner as guest singers, with voice actors Otto Sander, Benjamin Völz and Franziska Pigulla adding spoken words passages.

Weltreise was also released as a DVD including a travel movie to the soundtrack.

The album achieved platinum status in Germany in 2016.

Track listing

Charts

Weekly charts

Year-end charts

References

External links
 discogs.com

2001 albums
Trance albums
Schiller (band) albums